The 1978 Tirreno–Adriatico was the 13th edition of the Tirreno–Adriatico cycle race and was held from 11 March to 16 March 1978. The race started in Santa Marinella and finished in San Benedetto del Tronto. The race was won by Giuseppe Saronni of the Scic team.

General classification

References

1978
1978 in Italian sport